Marshall Islands competed at the 2019 World Athletics Championships in Doha, Qatar from 27 September to 6 October 2019.

Results

Men
Track and road events

References

Marshall Islands
World Championships in Athletics
2019